Porto Seguro (Safe Harbor in English), is a city located in the far south of Bahia, Brazil. The area that includes Porto Seguro and neighbouring Santa Cruz Cabrália and Eunápolis holds a distinctive place in Brazilian history: in 1500 it was the first landing point of Portuguese navigators, principally Pedro Álvares Cabral.
The crime rate is considered high, as is the case in the rest of Bahia.

Geography

Climate

The climate in Porto Seguro is warm, pleasant, and partly cloudy. Over the course of the year, the temperature typically varies from 19 °C lows (67 °F) to 29C highs (84 °F) and is rarely below 18 °C (65 °F) or above 31 °C (88 °F). The temperature in Porto Seguro varies so little throughout the year that it is not entirely meaningful to discuss hot and cold seasons.

Subdivisions
Porto Seguro is divided into five districts
Porto Seguro (city seat);
Arraial d'Ajuda;
Caraíva
Trancoso
Vale Verde

Conservation
The municipality contains the  Pau-Brasil Ecological Station, a fully protected conservation unit created in 1997 to protect a fragment of Atlantic Forest, and specifically to protect Brazil wood (Pau Brasil, Caesalpinia echinata).
It contains the  Rio dos Frades Wildlife Refuge, created in 2007 to protect the mouth of the Frades River.

Economy

The city is now considered one of the most important destinations of Brazil, receiving tourists from Brazil, Argentina, Uruguay, and Chile. The city and surrounding area have some luxury hotels and hundreds of smaller hotels, as well as an airport well connected with the major Brazilian cities. Apart from tourism, other important activities are agriculture (especially cashew and coconut), reforestation with eucalyptus trees, cattle, and trade and services.

The city offers one of the most famous Carnival parties in Bahia. “Electric Trios” (trucks carrying sound systems and live bands), dancing “blocos” and “cordões” (street dancing groups) drag thousands of tourists along the "Passarela do Álcool" Passageway (the traditional local avenue) and to beach bars.

Noted places

Historical Downtown Area
The historical site in the Cidade Alta area is a National Heritage Monument put under government trust by federal decree since 1973. It was one of the first towns in Brazil and played an important role during the first years of European colonization. It includes three churches and around 40 buildings (among private residential houses and public institutions), restored by the state government for the 500th anniversary celebration of Brazilian discovery.

Monte Pascoal National Park 
Created in 1961 to preserve the place where Brazil was discovered by Portuguese warriors. It includes swamp areas, salt marshes, river marshes, and a coastline around the rocky, high, round hill, considered the first point of land to be seen by the Portuguese traveler Pedro Álvares Cabral’s crew. Besides its historical importance, it also offers protection to one of the last stretches of Atlantic forest in the Northeastern area of Brazil. The area is aimed at preserving valuable woods such as Brazil wood, and still hosts many species of animals threatened by extinction, including the collared sloth and black bear.

Recife de Fora Sea Park
It was the first city-owned park in Brazil. During low tide, visitors can view a wide range of coral reefs, fish, and many sea species.

Glória Hillock
These are ruins of what many consider to be the São Francisco Church, where Ynaiá, an Indian woman who died for the love of a crewmember of Portuguese navigator Gonçalo Coelho's fleet, was buried. The São Francisco Church is said to be the first one built in Brazil in baroque style, probably in 1504, whose ruins date to 1730.

The Nossa Senhora da Penha Matrix Church
Located on Pero de Campos Tourinho Square, in Cidade Alta, it was built at the end of the 18th century. It comprises a nave, a main chapel, a sacristy, and a bell tower.

Jaqueira Indigenous Protection Reservation 
A huge jackfruit tree trunk, tumbled down by nature itself, represents the return to one’s origins and acts as a historical and cultural reference to honor the ancestral fathers and mothers of Pataxó families who recently moved into this  Indian protection area. Their huts, spread around original Atlantic Forest woods, retain the original formats, giving visitors the impression of being back 500 years in time to pre-Columbian Brazil.

The Discovery Outdoors Museum
An outdoors, natural museum, whose “art galleries” are its beaches, valleys and natural trails and whose “collection” is a set of geographical formations and traditional villages, disposed as art works in permanent exhibition, engraved in ancient media, which are spread along the  length of Bahia’s historical southern coastline.

Transport

Airway
Porto Seguro Airport was opened in 1982. Its passenger terminal was very simple and small; this building is now occupied by the Fire Department of the city. In 1997, the airport was reopened, having received a new passenger terminal, new aircraft parking lot, and extension of runway to operate large aircraft. In 2010 the airport had some major renovations preparing the city to host several of the International football teams who had a training camp in Porto Seguro for the 2014 FIFA World Cup.

References

External links

Saiba Tudo Acesse : Porto Seguro - Bahia

Populated coastal places in Bahia
Former Portuguese colonies
Municipalities in Bahia
National heritage sites of Bahia
1534 establishments in the Portuguese Empire
Populated places established in 1534